Neil Petruic (born July 30, 1982) is a Canadian former professional ice hockey player. He was selected by the Ottawa Senators in the 8th round (235th overall) of the 2001 NHL Entry Draft. Prior to the 2010–11 season, on September 24, 2010, Petruic signed a contract with the Hamilton Bulldogs and was invited to NHL affiliate, the Montreal Canadiens training camp, before returning to the Bulldogs.

Career statistics

Regular season and playoffs

References

External links

1982 births
Living people
Binghamton Senators players
Bolzano HC players
Canadian ice hockey defencemen
Charlotte Checkers (1993–2010) players
Hamilton Bulldogs (AHL) players
Ice hockey people from Saskatchewan
Manitoba Moose players
Minnesota Duluth Bulldogs men's ice hockey players
Ottawa Senators draft picks
Sportspeople from Regina, Saskatchewan
Stockton Thunder players
Victoria Salmon Kings players
Canadian expatriate ice hockey players in Italy